Physical fitness is maintained by a range of physical activities. Physical activity is defined by the World Health Organization as "any bodily movement produced by skeletal muscles that requires energy expenditure." Human factors and social influences are important in starting and maintaining such activities. Social environments can influence motivation and persistence, through pressures towards social conformity.

Obesity

Obesity is a physical marker of poor health, increasing the likelihood of various diseases. Due to social constructs surrounding health, the belief that being skinny is healthy and discrimination against those perceived to be 'unhealthy', people who are considered overweight or obese on the BMI scale face many social challenges. Challenges can range from basic things such as buying clothes, pressure from society to change their body, and being unable to get a job. This can lead to various problems such as eating disorders, self-esteem issues, and misdiagnosis and improper treatment of physical ailments due to discrimination. People who are obese are also less likely to seek medical care than people who are not obese, even if their weight is caused by medical problems.

Adult

Children
Obesity can lower mood and lower self-esteem.

Reasons for inactivity

In the US, only 26% of adults engage in vigorous leisure-time activity (which includes a sport) or exercising three or more times per week. In an effort to increase adult involvement and decrease the percentage of adult inactivity, the US Department of Health and Human Services has set a national health objective for 2010 that hopes to "Reduce the prevalence of no leisure time activity from more than 25 percent to 20 percent of US adults" (Berlin, Storti, and Brach 1137). In Australia, the Australian Bureau of Statistics found that in 2011/12 adults spent an average of 33 minutes per day doing physical activity with 60% of the population doing less than 30 minutes and fewer than 20% doing an hour or more per day on average. The survey also showed almost 30% of the adult population reporting more than five hours of sedentary leisure activity each day.

Inactivity in young people has been seen to be rising in recent years, and the prevalence of sedentary leisure activities for children is significant. Video games and the internet may play a part in this. It has been found that "26 percent of children and adolescents in the United States spend more than four hours a day watching television, and they have become even more sedentary with access to computers and video games" (Damlo 1434). Along with, "62 percent of children nine to thirteen years of age do not participate in organized physical activities, and 23 percent do not participate in non-organized physical activities outside of school hours" (1434).

One reason for physical inactivity may be the perception that there is nowhere safe to do so. Ways that can help increase the amount of physical activity is to plan and build the environment in a way that makes the population of the community feel safe to be physically active in the area. This could be done for example by slowing speed limits to safer speeds and providing safe street crossings and also by building infrastructure close to the street and pathways with safe pedestrian and cycle access and safe bike parking.

Initiatives
Given the social and economic costs of low levels of physical activity there have been a number of public policy initiatives to raise the level, particularly focusing on children and adolescents.

Wellness On Wheels

The Wear Valley District Council along with its local Durham Dales Primary Care Trust in England developed an innovative scheme in an effort to combat the high levels of poor health and obesity in the area. They created a mobile gym with electronic fitness monitoring equipment, which is called "WOW" (Wellness on Wheels). The strategy was to take exercise to people's homes rather than waiting for them to use existing leisure facilities.

Walking School Bus

Walking buses have students walking to their designated stops, but they are then chaperoned to school by people walking on foot, rather than taking the school bus.

Video games
Several video game companies have developed ways to mix the two spectrums of electronic and exercise. Dance Dance Revolution, perhaps the most well-known exercise game, had players earn points by dancing to a beat. Players earn more points for tapping dance pads on the dancing platform at precise times and in proper sequences, thereby incorporating physical exercise.

In 2006 Nintendo introduced the Wii, a next generation game console the features a motion sensitive controller.

Sedentary behaviour 
According to Biddle (2007) the social influence of technology, such as electronic gaming and screen time are the main causes towards actions of sedentary behaviour, with TV viewing and computer use being the most prevalent benefactors. However, sedentary behaviours, are not simply “opposites” of physical activity, but instead suggests that they "displace time that would otherwise be used for physical activity".

Children and adolescents, are deemed most at risk for these sedentary behaviours with estimates for youth TV viewing being around "1.8 - 2.8 hours per day". Also Biddle (2007) states that for young people "television took up 40% of the time spent in the five most prevalent sedentary behaviours during the week and 37% at weekends" which stresses the negative impact of these social and technological advances on physical activity and fitness behaviour.

The study Hardy, Dobbins, Booth, Denney, Wilson and Okely (2006) stated that, "there are powerful societal inducements to be inactive and there are increasing concerns of an emerging preference among young people to adopt sedentary lifestyles." Based on Australian adolescents, results were received which indicated that many young people are engaging in sedentary behaviour, with grade 6's spending 34 hours per week, grade 8's with 41 hours and grade 10's with 45 hours.

Another study Zimmit (2010), found a strong, positive association between sedentary behaviours, in particular TV viewing, with obesity and low participation levels. The study stated that in the last 20 years (1990-2010), the prevalence of obesity in Australia has more than doubled. It stresses "public health initiatives targeting the reduction of sedentary pursuits may be necessary to curb the obesity epidemic."

According to the study Martínez-González, Alfredo Martínez, Hu, Gibney, & Kearney, (1999) "Obesity is the most prevalent nutrition-related problem in Western societies, and it is associated with an important burden of suffering in terms of mortality, morbidity and psychological stress". The study stresses that people suffering from obesity place a severe burden on health care systems, and that obesity could become the leading public health problem in the next century.

See also
 
 
 Health promotion
 
 Healthy diet
 Human development (biology)
 Human development (psychology)
 Jaywalking
 Lack of physical education
 Maslow's hierarchy of needs
 Personal trainer
 Positive psychology
 President's Council on Physical Fitness and Sports
 Sport psychology

References

Further reading

External links
 President's Council on Physical Fitness and Sports

Health promotion
Sports science
Sports culture
Human behavior